Russula variata is an edible basidiomycete mushroom of the genus Russula native to North America.

See also
 List of Russula species

References

External links

variata
Edible fungi
Fungi described in 1881
Fungi of North America